Mihiliya Methsarani (born 15 January 1998) is a Sri Lankan female squash player. She has represented Sri Lanka in international competitions such as Asian Youth Games, South Asian Games, Commonwealth Games and has won medals. Currently, she is considered as Sri Lanka's best squash player.

Methsarani has won the National Squash Championship of Sri Lanka six times (2012, 2013, 2014, 2016, 2017, and 2018).  Her secondary education and training was at Sirimavo Bandaranaike Vidyalaya.

Mihiliya Methsarani qualified to compete for Sri Lanka at the 2018 Commonwealth Games, which was her second Commonwealth Games appearance for Sri Lanka. During the 2018 Gold Coast Commonwealth Games, she became the first Sri Lankan squash player ever to qualify for a final round of an international squash tournament after qualifying for the plate final round during the women's singles event. In the plate final of the women's singles during the 2018 Commonwealth Games, she lost to Meagan Best of Barbados 1-3.

In 2018, Mihiliya enrolled at Mount Holyoke College, where she plays on the intercollegiate squash team, and is known by the name of Mihiliya Kalahe Arachchige.

References

External links 
 
 Profile at Glasgow 2014

1998 births
Living people
Sri Lankan female squash players
Commonwealth Games competitors for Sri Lanka
Squash players at the 2014 Commonwealth Games
Squash players at the 2018 Commonwealth Games
Asian Games competitors for Sri Lanka
Squash players at the 2018 Asian Games
South Asian Games bronze medalists for Sri Lanka
South Asian Games medalists in squash

Mount Holyoke College alumni
20th-century Sri Lankan women
21st-century Sri Lankan women